Juan Pablo Monticelli Jiménez (born August 26, 1997) was an American soccer player who played as a defender.

Career

Orlando City B
Prior to the 2020 season, Monticelli joined USL League One club Orlando City B, signing a professional contract with the club. He made his league debut for the club on August 1, 2020, coming on as a 63rd-minute substitute for Julian Kennedy in a 2–0 away defeat to Tormenta FC. He was released at the end of the season.

Richmond Kickers
In March 2021, Monticelli joined Richmond Kickers for the 2021 season. He scored on his Kickers debut on April 17 in a 3–0 win over New England Revolution II.

Following the 2021 season, Monitcelli announced his retirement from playing professional soccer.

Career statistics

Club

References

External links
Juan Pablo Monticelli at Orlando City

1997 births
Living people
Orlando City B players
USL League One players
American soccer players
Soccer players from El Paso, Texas
Association football defenders
Coras de Nayarit F.C. footballers
Irapuato F.C. footballers
American expatriate sportspeople in Mexico
Expatriate footballers in Mexico
American expatriate soccer players
Richmond Kickers players